Salvage Master Nicholas Sloane (born 5 July 1961 in Kitwe, Zambia) is an expert in marine salvage.

He is best known for leading the salvage operation of the wrecked Costa Concordia in September 2013. The ship had collided with rocks near Isola del Giglio, Tuscany in January 2012, and had been aground for 20 months before its successful salvage. The salvage was preceded by 16 months of preparatory work, and took a total of 19 hours to complete.

In 2015 Sloane won the German Sea Prize for this salvage action.

External links 
 
 Captain Nicholas Sloane at sloanemarine.com

References 

1961 births
Living people
Zambian emigrants to South Africa
Alumni of Kearsney College